This is a list of regular festivals and events in the Isle of Man, both traditional and recently established.

Traditional annual events

The Isle of Man is a Celtic nation, and as such, there are close correspondences to Irish and Scottish festivals.

Modern sports events

Other events

References 

Manx culture
Isle of Man-related lists
 
Isle of Man